Abortion is the termination of human pregnancy, often performed in the first 28 weeks of pregnancy. In 1973, the United States Supreme Court in Roe v. Wade recognized a constitutional right to obtain an abortion without excessive government restriction, and in 1992 the Court in Planned Parenthood v. Casey invalidated restrictions that create an undue burden on people seeking abortions. Since then, there has continued to be an abortion debate in the United States, and some states have passed laws in the form of regulation of abortions but which have the purpose or effect of restricting its provision. The proponents of such laws argue they do not create an undue burden. Some state laws that impact the availability of abortions have been upheld by courts. In 2022, Roe and Casey were overturned by the Supreme Court in Dobbs v. Jackson Women's Health Organization, meaning that states may now regulate abortion in ways that were not previously permitted.

Abortion clinic regulations

An abortion clinic is a medical facility that provides abortions. Abortion clinics may be private or public medical practices or nonprofit organizations. In 27 major cities, and much of rural America, most people live 100 miles or more from an abortion clinic.

Regulations for abortions in the United States include state licensing requirements, federal workplace safety requirements, and association requirements. Abortion clinics may also self-impose more stringent requirements than what these regulations require.

Post Roe v. Wade, many states have passed TRAP (Targeted Regulation of Abortion Providers) laws. These regulations are designed to limit the number of abortions performed by decreasing the number of facilities permitted to perform abortions.

One example of a TRAP law is a requirement which states that doctors performing abortions must have admitting privileges at a nearby hospital. Local hospitals may choose to deny admitting privileges to medical professionals if the medical professional is known to be an abortion provider. Critics of admitting privileges laws and other TRAP laws include the American College of Obstetricians and Gynecologists, the American Public Health Association, and the American Medical Association, which have argued that such laws are medically unnecessary and that abortion is already "very safe" in the United States.

In 2011, the crimes of Kermit Gosnell, a physician who ran an abortion clinic in Philadelphia, spurred federal and state bills to more strictly regulate abortion facilities. Opponents of the restrictions questioned whether stricter regulations would have deterred Gosnell, who was alleged to be knowingly in violation of existing regulations.

Following the passage of a 2013 Wisconsin law requiring abortion providers to have admitting privileges at a nearby hospital, three Catholic hospital systems in the state intended to deny admitting privileges to abortion providers. Wisconsin's attorney general said this intent violated the Church Amendment of 1973, which prohibits hospitals from receiving federal funds from discriminating against a doctor on the basis of whether the doctor provides abortions.

In 2015, an Arkansas law required a physician who sought to provide an abortion pill to contract another physician who had to admit privileges at a nearby hospital. As a result, no providers could offer medication abortions in Arkansas and two Planned Parenthoods within the state cancelled their abortion services. Critics argued that no evidence was presented that hospital admitting privileges improve the safety of abortions.

In March 2016, Whole Women's Health v Hellerstedt was heard by the Supreme Court. Over eighty amicus curiae briefs were filed with the Court. The case was decided on June 27, 2016, and was reversed and remanded, 5–3, in an opinion by Justice Breyer. In summary, the Supreme Court ruled that Texas cannot place restrictions on the delivery of abortion services that create an undue burden for women seeking an abortion.

In March 2020, the Supreme Court decided in a 5–4 to reverse a lower court's ruling of allowing a Louisiana law to take effect in which abortion clinics required admitting privileges within 30 miles.

In June 2020, the Supreme Court held in June Medical Services LLC v Russo that a Louisiana law requiring physicians who perform abortions to have admitting privileges at a local hospital was unconstitutional, and confirmed the Supreme Court's ruling in Whole Woman's Health v. Hellerstedt.

Federal funding of abortions
The Hyde Amendment bars the use of federal funds to pay for abortion except to save the life of the pregnant woman, or if the pregnancy arises from incest or rape. Before the Hyde Amendment took effect in 1980, an estimated 300,000 abortions were performed annually using federal funds. The provision withholds federal Medicaid funding of abortions, which impacts especially low-income families.

Laws targeting methods of practice
On 18 April 2007, the U.S. Supreme Court upheld the Partial-Birth Abortion Ban Act that banned abortions in the second trimester, which medical doctors say is the safest time for an abortion to protect the women's health. The Court's decision overturned more than 30 years of precedent.

Mandatory ultrasounds
Ultrasounds are not medically necessary for abortions; however, some states require physicians to perform an ultrasound, and some require the people seeking an abortion to view the ultrasound and listen to the fetus's heartbeat if any. As of May 2019, twelve states required people seeking an abortion to have an ultrasound before being allowed to have the procedure. This number was 26 in September 2020. 14 states required people to be issued with ultrasound information in May 2019. Mandatory transvaginal ultrasounds have been particularly controversial. In Texas, for instance, even if previous ultrasounds had indicated severe congenital defects, a person seeking an abortion was required under a 2012 law to have another ultrasound done, "administered by [their] abortion doctor, and [they had to] listen to a state-mandated description of the fetus [they were] about to abort", though state-issued guidelines later eliminated the ultrasound requirement if the fetus had an "irreversible medical condition". Some states require people to seek counseling after the ultrasound to determine if they would like to continue with an abortion.

On November 12, 2013, the U.S. Supreme Court declined to hear an appeal by the state of Oklahoma to the overturning of a bill that mandated compulsory ultrasound examinations.

Waiting periods

27 states require a person seeking an abortion to wait up to six days, most often 1 day, after receiving counseling and before having the abortion. 14 states require the person to make two trips to the clinic before receiving an abortion as they must receive counseling in person at the clinic, wait the designated waiting period, and return to the clinic to have the procedure done. South Dakota requires the person to obtain mandatory counseling from an anti-abortion crisis pregnancy center during this time frame.

Six-week bans

Several states have passed six-week abortion bans that make abortions illegal as soon as embryonic or fetal cardiac activity can be detected. Proponents of this type of legislation call these bills "fetal heartbeat bills"; however, many doctors believe this to be a misnomer due to the fact that the sound the bill refers to is electrical activity of the cells, not the opening and closing of valves of the heart.

Status of most restrictive states 
The Guttmacher Institute has designated 12 states as being having the most restrictive abortion restrictions.

 Alabama
 Arkansas
 Idaho
 Kentucky
 Louisiana
 Mississipi
 Missouri
 Oklahoma
 South Dakota
 Tennessee
 Texas
 West Virginia

Physician scripts
Some states require a doctor to read a prepared script to the person seeking an abortion to secure informed consent. These scripts may include medically inaccurate information intended to persuade the patient not to have an abortion, such as the claim that the abortion will increase the risk of breast cancer or of psychological problems, which are not supported by mainstream medical organizations or scientific consensus. As of July 2013, 12 states require that women be given information on the ability of a fetus to feel pain. In Planned Parenthood v. Rounds, the Eighth Circuit Court of Appeals ruled that a South Dakota law requiring doctors to give patients false or misleading information about the suicide risk in women who have abortions was not unconstitutional. Alaska, Kansas, Mississippi, Oklahoma, and Texas mandate that before an abortion can be performed, the patient must be counseled on the link between abortion and breast cancer. There is currently no evidence from scientific research that abortion has the ability to cause breast cancer. Kansas, Louisiana, Mississippi, Nevada, North Carolina, South Dakota, Texas, and West Virginia mandate that patients receive counseling on the potential psychological impacts of abortion on the person who receive them before an abortion can be given. Five states require that an abortion patient is counseled that personhood begins at conception.

Liability
Physicians can be liable for the abortion of a fetus if the right procedures are not taken. Doctors should inform every patient of all material risks of the procedure. The doctors can not give a small number of details to the patient but everything that will be done must be presented. A 1997 Louisiana law creates a civil cause of action for abortion-related damages, including damage to the unborn, for up to ten years after the abortion. The same law also bars the state's Patient's Compensation Fund, which limits malpractice liability for participating physicians, from insuring against abortion-related claims. An attorney for the Center for Reproductive Rights, which opposes the law, said the law is an attempt to drive abortion providers out of practice, and that every completed abortion imposes strict liability under the law because abortion necessarily involves damage to the unborn.

Reporting
As of 2010, 46 of 50 states and the District of Columbia had either mandatory or voluntary reporting of abortion statistics. According to an associate of the Guttmacher Institute, reporting requirements were generally "benign" and treated confidentially, but the requirements in some states have become more intrusive.

A 2009 Oklahoma law, overturned by a federal court in 2010, would have required doctors to report information from a 37-question form about every person receiving an abortion to the state health department for publication in an online registry. A lawyer for the Center for Reproductive Rights, a co-plaintiff in the lawsuit challenging the law, said the law would have made public potentially identifying details about the people, and was intended to dissuade people from seeking abortions. Todd Lamb, the state senator who sponsored the law, called it "essential in protecting the sanctity of life" and "pro-life".

Transportation Issues to accessing abortion
In states such as Alabama and Mississippi people often have the challenge of traveling far distances to obtain a medical abortion. As of 2019, there are only three healthcare clinics in Alabama that offer abortion. According to Guttmacher Institute, about one-third of people seeking an abortion in Alabama must travel more than 25 miles to receive the procedure. Furthermore, only seven percent of counties in Alabama have a medical provider in the county that offers abortion.

People often must seek two trips to an abortion provider due to a waiting period. The waiting period is typically 48 hours before the scheduled abortion. Organizations such as Yellowhammer Fund, help people seeking an abortion. They provide financial costs and transportation for women in Alabama, Mississippi, and the Florida panhandle area. On the other hand, most clinics do not offer transportation or financial resources to patients. Most of the time, it is the responsibility of a patient to find their means of transportation and finances to fund the abortion.

Language barriers and immigrant issues related to abortion
An issue that can arise among non-native English speakers or immigrant people is the lack of access to a translator while attempting to seek an abortion. Under federal law, citing the Title VI of the Civil Rights Act of 1964 and the Affordable Care Act requires that providers who receive federal funding provide an oral interpreter and translated material. According to the American Civil Liberties Union, in 1976, Congress passed a bill called the Hyde Amendment which purposely excludes abortion from being included in healthcare services provided to people through Medicaid. The only exception to this rule is if a person's life is in danger due to pregnancy, cases of rape or incest, illness, or injury. This results in many healthcare clinics that offer abortion, not being able to accommodate non-English speaking patients. Due to the limitations set by the federal government. There are limited resources for non-English speaking patients when it comes to abortion.

Additionally, when it comes to organizations such as the United States Immigration and Customs Enforcement (ICE), abortion is heavily regulated. ICE complies with the Hyde Amendment from 1976, and only offers abortion for reasons related to incest, rape, or the endangerment of a mother's life due to pregnancy. According to the National Latina Institute for Reproductive Justice, around 80% of women attempting to enter the United States through illegal means, get sexually assaulted. Thus, a high number of women in ICE detention centers often seek medical abortions. Furthermore, there have been proposals by Alabama Representative Robert Aderholt to attempt to allow ICE employees to refuse to conduct an abortion. Such proposals have so far not passed in congress. Under the Trump administration, minors who were held in ICE custody were unable to seek an abortion. According to PBS, a federal appeals court ruled against the Trump administration on June 14, 2019. The three federal judges cited that the Trump administration could not regulate a minor's decision to receive a medical abortion. Furthermore, the policy dates to 2017, when the ban was supposed to take effect. The ban specifically targets immigrant minors attempting to enter the country, which is then held by the United States government for attempting to illegally enter the US. At the time, the Trump administration could have attempted to ask the United States Court of Appeals to hear the case, but that seems to have never gone through.

Impact of the COVID-19 pandemic on access to abortion
In March 2020, COVID-19 impacted the United States, and the CDC declared COVID-19 a pandemic. During this time, numerous states began issuing orders to postpone any non-essential medical products, specifically abortion. Texas restricted abortion access on March 23, 2020, citing that a temporary ban on non-essential medical services was necessary to curb the COVID-19 pandemic. In the following weeks, more states such as Ohio, Alabama, Iowa, and Oklahoma followed Texas in the same ban on non-essential produces. In a press conference on March 27, 2020, Iowa Governor Kim Reynolds clarified that surgical abortion procedures would be included in the temporary hold on all non-essential surgeries.

The Supreme Court accepted a request from the Food and Drug Administration to ban medical providers from sending mifepristone (the “abortion pill”) via mail. This pill is primarily used for ending pregnancies that are within the first trimester. The rule was suspended by a federal judge in the summer of 2020 due to the ongoing pandemic. The reinstated rule forces people seeking an abortion to go into a medical provider's office and have an in-person visit to receive the pill. The Food and Drug Administration attempted to appeal the original decision on August 26, 2020, to the Supreme Court. The Supreme Court responded with a denial to the Food and Drug Administration to overturn the order. The Supreme Court cited that the Food and Drug Administration needed to provide more information as to why Judge Chuang's order needed to be overturned. Finally, on January 12, 2021, the Trump Administration submitted a more detailed request, which was granted by the Supreme court to lift the suspension on not requiring in-person visits and mailing of the abortion pill.

Limitations for minors under 18
In around 37 states, a parental figure is required to have a say in a minor's decision related to abortion. Furthermore, in 27 states, one or both parents are required to give their permission to the minor. Ten states require both parents to consent to medical abortion. Furthermore, a minor may not have the finances or transportation to seek an abortion. Since most minors are labeled as dependent on their parents' or guardians' tax forms, they most likely do not have the money to obtain an abortion. Also, if the minor is on their guardian's insurance, the guardian has access to the health insurance and information of the minor. It is estimated that around 350,000 United States teenagers under the of 18 become pregnant each year. Of that population, around 31% of them have a medical abortion.

Insurance limitations
In twelve states, private insurance is restricted from covering abortion under their plans. In most cases, insurance only covers abortion if a person's life is endangered by a medical professional. If an underinsured or uninsured person seeks an abortion, they may need to pay out-of-pocket costs to receive the treatment needed. These limitations of the lack of insurance coverage greatly affect mostly low-income people of color. The average "abortion pill" cost around US$500. On top of that, under the Affordable Care Act passed in 2010 by congress, abortion is not required to be covered under the ten essential coverages. Government-run health insurance, such as Medicaid, can provide coverage for medical abortion.

See also
 Unborn Victims of Violence Act
 Abortion in the United States
 Abortion in the United States by state
 Hyde Amendment
 Minors and abortion
 Partial-Birth Abortion Ban Act
 Trigger law
 War on Women
 Whole Woman's Health v. Cole

References

External links
 Distance to the nearest abortion provider for women aged 15–44, 2000–2014, by state or county